Kirill Andreyevich Minov (born January 2, 1993) is a Russian former competitive ice dancer who represented South Korea with partner Rebeka Kim, he is the 2016 South Korean national champion and placed sixth at the 2014 World Junior Championships.

Career 
Minov skated with Svetlana Pavlova from 2007 to 2010. He partnered Ekaterina Denisova in the 2010–11 season.

Partnership with Rebeka Kim 
In 2012, Minov began competing internationally for South Korea with partner Rebeka Kim. They are coached by Irina Zhuk and Alexander Svinin. Kim/Minov were assigned to 2012–13 ISU Junior Grand Prix events in Austria and Croatia. They missed the first event waiting for the International Skating Union to grant permission for Minov's change of country — he was cleared to represent South Korea on September 21, 2012. Kim/Minov finished 10th in their international debut in Croatia. They qualified for the free dance at the 2013 World Junior Championships in Milan and finished 20th overall.

In November 2013, Kim/Minov won the junior ice dance event at the 2013 NRW Trophy which made them the first Korean ice dance team to win an international event. They placed sixth at the 2014 World Junior Championships in Sofia.

Programs

With Kim

Competitive highlights

With Kim

Detailed results

Post–2014

Pre–2014

 ISU Personal bests highlighted in bold

References

External links 
 

1993 births
South Korean male ice dancers
Russian male ice dancers
Living people
Figure skaters from Moscow